Courtney Summers (born 1986 in Belleville, Ontario, Canada) is a Canadian writer of young adult fiction. Her most famous known works are Cracked Up to Be, This is Not a Test, All the Rage, and Sadie.

Career

Her first novel, Cracked Up to Be, was published in December 2008 and was the 2009 Cybils Award Winner for YA Fiction. Her sophomore novel, Some Girls Are, was published in January 2010, and received starred reviews from Kirkus Reviews, Publishers Weekly, School Library Journal and was a 2010 Goodreads Choice Nominee in the YA Fiction category. Both novels were repackaged as a 2-in-1 edition titled What Goes Around in September 2013.

Her third novel, Fall for Anything, was published in December 2010 and received starred reviews from Kirkus Reviews and Booklist.

This is Not a Test was published June 2012 and was set during the zombie apocalypse. Prior to its release, all of Summers' novels were contemporary and realistic. This is Not a Test received a starred review from Publishers Weekly and was optioned for television by Sony. Summers announced that a script was currently in development in April 2015. In January 2015, Summers released an e-novella sequel to This is Not a Test, Please Remain Calm.

Summers' fifth novel, All the Rage, was her hardcover debut and published in April 2015. It was chosen as the sixth official selection of Tumblr's Reblog Book Club and received starred reviews from Kirkus Reviews, Publishers Weekly and School Library Journal. It was also named a Spring 2015 Junior Library Guild Selection.

On April 14, 2015, to mark the release of All the Rage, Summers launched the hashtag campaign #ToTheGirls, encouraging people to send messages of support and positivity to girls across social media. #ToTheGirls trended worldwide on Twitter. Notable press coverage included The Today Show and it was named one of the most important feminist hashtags of 2015 by Mic News.

Her novel Sadie tells the story of a teenager named Sadie Hunter whose little sister Mattie was murdered. Sadie seeks revenge against the man she believes killed Mattie. The book was released on September 4, 2018, and is told from two perspectives: some chapters offering Sadie's point of view and some chapters being styled as transcripts from a podcast called "The Girls" hosted by a man named West McCray. The release of the book was accompanied by the release of a mock true-crime podcast titled The Girls: Find Sadie which is available on Apple Podcasts and Stitcher. Sadie became a New York Times bestseller on September 29, 2018, and has been awarded the 2019 Edgar Award for Best Young Adult literature from the Mystery Writers of America.  Sadie also won the 2019 Odyssey Award from the American Library Association and was a Bank Street Children's Book Committee's Best Book of the Year in 2019.  

Summers has also contributed short stories to the anthologies Defy the Dark and Violent Ends.

Works

Books
 Cracked Up to Be, St. Martin's Press (2008)
 Some Girls Are, St. Martin's Press (2010)
 Fall for Anything, St. Martin's Press (2011)
 This is Not a Test, St. Martin's Press (2012)
 What Goes Around, St. Martin's Press (2013)
 Please Remain Calm, St. Martin's Press (2015)
 All the Rage, St. Martin's Press (2015)
Sadie, St. Martin's Press (2018)
The Project, St. Martin's Press (2021)
I'm the Girl, Wednesday Books (2022)

Short stories
 "Sleepstalk", Defy the Dark edited by Saundra Mitchell
 "The Likability Rule", Violent Ends edited by Shaun Hutchinson (2015)

Essays 

 "Here We Are: Feminism for the Real World", Here We Are: Feminism for the Real World from Algonquin BFYR, January 2017

Awards and nominations

References

External links 

 
 
 

1986 births
Canadian writers of young adult literature
Living people
Date of birth missing (living people)
21st-century Canadian women writers
Women writers of young adult literature
Writers from Belleville, Ontario
Canadian women novelists
21st-century Canadian novelists